The United Nations Convention on Certain Conventional Weapons (CCW or CCWC), concluded at Geneva on October 10, 1980, and entered into force in December 1983, seeks to prohibit or restrict the use of certain conventional weapons which are considered excessively injurious or whose effects are indiscriminate. The full title is Convention on Prohibitions or Restrictions on the Use of Certain Conventional Weapons Which May Be Deemed to Be Excessively Injurious or to Have Indiscriminate Effects. The convention covers land mines, booby traps, incendiary devices, blinding laser weapons and clearance of explosive remnants of war.

Objectives
The aim of the Convention and its Protocols is to provide new rules for the protection of civilians from injury by weapons that are used in armed conflicts and also to protect combatants from unnecessary suffering.  The convention covers fragments that are undetectable in the human body by X-rays, landmines and booby traps, and incendiary weapons, blinding laser weapons and the clearance of explosive remnants of war. Parties to the convention must take legislative and other actions to ensure compliance with the convention.

CCWC along with the Chemical Weapons Convention (CWC) serves as an umbrella for protocols dealing with specific weapons. The Convention and its annexed Protocols apply in all types of armed conflict, both international and non-international. This was not the case when the convention was first adopted, but the scope was expanded by two conferences in 1996 and 2001. Some provisions also apply after open hostilities has ended, such as the rules in protocols II and V about minimizing the dangers from mines and other ordnance.

CCWC lacks verification and enforcement mechanisms and spells out no formal process for resolving compliance concerns. A state-party can refute its commitment to the convention or any of the protocols, but it will remain legally bound until one year after notifying the treaty depositary, the UN Secretary-General, of its intent to be free of its obligations.

Adoption and entry into force
The CCWC consist of a set of additional protocols first formulated on October 10, 1980, in Geneva and entered into force on December 2, 1983. As of the end of September 2022, there are 126 state parties to the convention. Some of those countries have only adopted some of the five protocols, with two being the minimum required to be considered a party.

The convention has five protocols:
Protocol I restricts weapons with non-detectable fragments
Protocol II restricts landmines, booby traps
Protocol III restricts incendiary weapons
Protocol IV restricts blinding laser weapons (adopted on October 13, 1995, in Vienna)
Protocol V sets out obligations and best practice for the clearance of explosive remnants of war, adopted on November 28, 2003, in Geneva

Protocol II was amended in 1996 (extending its scope of application), and entered in force on December 3, 1998. The amendment extended the restrictions on landmine use to internal conflicts; established reliability standards for remotely delivered mines; and prohibited the use of non-detectable fragments in anti-personnel landmines (APL). The failure to agree to a total ban on landmines led to the Ottawa Treaty.

Protocol I: Non-Detectable Fragments
Protocol I on Non-Detectable Fragments prohibits the use of any weapon the primary effect of which is to injure by fragments which are not detectable in the human body by X-rays. The reason is that such fragments are difficult to remove and cause unnecessary suffering. The protocol applies when the "primary effect" is to injure by non-detectable fragments and does not prohibit all use of e.g. plastic in weapons design.

Protocol II: Mines, Booby Traps and Other Devices

Protocol II on Prohibitions or Restrictions on the Use of Mines, Booby-Traps and Other Devices was amended on May 3, 1996, to strengthen its provisions and extend the scope of application to cover both international and internal armed conflicts. The protocol regulates, but does not ban, land mines. It prohibits the use of non-detectable anti-personnel mines and their transfer; prohibits the use of non-self-destructing and non-self-deactivating mines outside fenced, monitored and marked areas; prohibits directing mines and booby traps against civilians; requires parties to the conflict to remove mines and booby traps when the conflict ends; broadens obligations of protecting peacekeeping and other missions of the United Nations and its agencies; requires States to enforce compliance with its provisions within their jurisdiction; and calls for penal sanctions in case of violation.

Protocol III: Incendiary Weapons

Protocol III on Prohibitions or Restrictions on the Use of Incendiary Weapons prohibits, in all circumstances, making the civilian population as such, individual civilians or civilian objects, the object of attack by any weapon or munition which is primarily designed to set fire to objects or to cause burn injury to persons through the action of flame, heat or a combination thereof, produced by a chemical reaction of a substance delivered on the target. The protocol also prohibits the use of air-delivered incendiary weapons against military targets within a concentration of civilians, and limits the use of incendiary weapons delivered by other means. Forest and other plants may not be a target unless they are used to conceal combatants or other military objectives.
Protocol III lists certain munition types like smoke shells which only have a secondary or additional incendiary effect; these munition types are not considered to be incendiary weapons.

Protocol IV: Blinding Laser Weapons

Protocol IV on Blinding Laser Weapons prohibits the use of laser weapons specifically designed to cause permanent blindness. The parties to the protocol also agree to not transfer such weapons to any state or non-state entity. The protocol does not prohibit laser systems where blinding is an incidental or collateral effect, but parties that agree to it must take all feasible precautions to avoid such effects.

Protocol V: Explosive Remnants of War

Protocol V on Explosive Remnants of War requires the clearance of UXO (unexploded ordnance), such as unexploded bomblets from cluster bombs and abandoned explosive weapons. At the cessation of active hostilities, Protocol V establishes a responsibility on parties that have used explosive weapons to assist with the clearance of unexploded ordnance that this use has created. Parties are also required, subject to certain qualifications, to provide information on their use of explosive weapons. Each party is responsible for the territory in their control after a conflict. The protocol does not apply to mines and other weapons covered by protocol II. The protocol came about as a result of a growing awareness during the 1990s that the protection against unexploded ordnance was insufficient. The protocol was adopted in 2003 and entered into force in 2006.

Other proposals
As of 2017, the CCW has failed to achieve consensus to open negotiations on adding a compliance mechanism to help ensure parties honor their commitments. China and Russia have opposed restrictions on anti-vehicle mines, such as a requirement that such mines self-deactivate. In the 2010s the CCW opened talks on restricting lethal autonomous weapons. As of 2021, most of the major powers oppose an international ban on lethal autonomous weapons.

See also
 United Nations Commission on Conventional Armaments, earlier attempt at regulation

References

External links

 Convention at the United Nations Audiovisual Library of International Law
 Fact Sheet at the Arms Control Association
 State parties to the treaty at the International Committee of the Red Cross

1980 in Switzerland
 
International humanitarian law treaties
Mine action
Treaties concluded in 1980
Treaties entered into force in 1983
Treaties of Albania
Treaties of Algeria
Treaties of Antigua and Barbuda
Treaties of Argentina
Treaties of Australia
Treaties of Austria
Treaties of Bahrain
Treaties of Bangladesh
Treaties of the Byelorussian Soviet Socialist Republic
Treaties of Belgium
Treaties of the People's Republic of Benin
Treaties of Bolivia
Treaties of Bosnia and Herzegovina
Treaties of Brazil
Treaties of the People's Republic of Bulgaria
Treaties of Burkina Faso
Treaties of Burundi
Treaties of Cambodia
Treaties of Cameroon
Treaties of Canada
Treaties of Cape Verde
Treaties of Chile
Treaties of the People's Republic of China
Treaties of Colombia
Treaties of Costa Rica
Treaties of Croatia
Treaties of Cuba
Treaties of Cyprus
Treaties of Czechoslovakia
Treaties of the Czech Republic
Treaties of Denmark
Treaties of Djibouti
Treaties of the Dominican Republic
Treaties of Ecuador
Treaties of El Salvador
Treaties of Estonia
Treaties of Finland
Treaties of France
Treaties of Gabon
Treaties of Georgia (country)
Treaties of Germany
Treaties of East Germany
Treaties of Greece
Treaties of Grenada
Treaties of Guatemala
Treaties of Guinea-Bissau
Treaties of the Holy See
Treaties of Honduras
Treaties of the Hungarian People's Republic
Treaties of Iceland
Treaties of India
Treaties of Iraq
Treaties of Ireland
Treaties of Israel
Treaties of Italy
Treaties of Ivory Coast
Treaties of Jamaica
Treaties of Japan
Treaties of Jordan
Treaties of Kazakhstan
Treaties of Kuwait
Treaties of Laos
Treaties of Latvia
Treaties of Lesotho
Treaties of Liberia
Treaties of Liechtenstein
Treaties of Lithuania
Treaties of Luxembourg
Treaties of Madagascar
Treaties of the Maldives
Treaties of Mali
Treaties of Malta
Treaties of Mauritius
Treaties of Mexico
Treaties of Moldova
Treaties of Monaco
Treaties of the Mongolian People's Republic
Treaties of Montenegro
Treaties of Morocco
Treaties of Nauru
Treaties of the Netherlands
Treaties of New Zealand
Treaties of Nicaragua
Treaties of Niger
Treaties of Norway
Treaties of Pakistan
Treaties of the State of Palestine
Treaties of Panama
Treaties of Paraguay
Treaties of Peru
Treaties of the Philippines
Treaties of the Polish People's Republic
Treaties of Portugal
Treaties of Qatar
Treaties of North Macedonia
Treaties of Romania
Treaties of the Soviet Union
Treaties of Saudi Arabia
Treaties of Senegal
Treaties of Serbia and Montenegro
Treaties of Seychelles
Treaties of Sierra Leone
Treaties of Slovakia
Treaties of Slovenia
Treaties of South Africa
Treaties of South Korea
Treaties of Spain
Treaties of Sri Lanka
Treaties of Saint Vincent and the Grenadines
Treaties of Sweden
Treaties of Switzerland
Treaties of Tajikistan
Treaties of Togo
Treaties of Tunisia
Treaties of Turkey
Treaties of Turkmenistan
Treaties of Uganda
Treaties of the Ukrainian Soviet Socialist Republic
Treaties of the United Arab Emirates
Treaties of the United Kingdom
Treaties of the United States
Treaties of Uruguay
Treaties of Uzbekistan
Treaties of Venezuela
Treaties of Yugoslavia
Treaties of Zambia
Treaties extended to the Faroe Islands
Treaties extended to Greenland
Treaties extended to the Caribbean Netherlands
United Nations treaties